"Have You Ever Been Mellow" is the first single of the Party Animals and was released on their debut album Good Vibrations. The track was released in 1996 and became their first number one hit in The Netherlands. The song contains a sample of "Have You Never Been Mellow" by Olivia Newton-John. The chorus was also reused except that "never" was replaced by "ever". Musically the song is totally different with a fast gabber beat. The song made the 1996 yearlist at a #21 position. The single was certified Gold. The song remains an often requested song in the Netherlands and reached the 35 position at 3FM's 90s Request Top 100 of 2006. It was a minor hit in the United Kingdom but, like other songs in its genre, sold better in Scotland.

Critical reception
A reviewer from Music Week rated the song three out of five, adding, "The happy hardcore track with helium hooks was a minor hit in May but, after gaining considerable support on The Box, should be big this time."

Track listing

Chart

Weekly charts

Year-end charts

References

External links
 Official site

1996 singles
Dutch Top 40 number-one singles
Party Animals (music group) songs
1996 songs